The 1874 NYU Violets football team represented New York University in the 1874 college football season.

Schedule

References

NYU
NYU Violets football seasons
College football winless seasons
NYU Violets football